25th & Welton station (sometimes styled as 25th•Welton) is a RTD light rail station in Denver, Colorado, United States. Originally operating as part of the D Line, the station was opened on October 8, 1994, and is operated by the Regional Transportation District. Located in the Five Points neighborhood, it is the stop closest to the Blair-Caldwell African American Research Library. The January 14, 2018, service changes introduced the L Line, which now serves this station in place of the D Line.

References 

RTD light rail stations in Denver
Railway stations in the United States opened in 1994
Five Points, Denver